Kobret is a low-grade form of heroin, notable for its use in Campania, Italy and its sale by criminal organizations in the area.  In Scampia, a neighborhood of Naples, the drug is sold by the criminal organization Camorra. In the large open-air drug market within Scampia, Kobret is sold along with cocaine, crack, hashish and heroin.  The drug is common along with heroin and cocaine along the Viale della Resistenza.

Notes

Further reading 
 Gomorrah by Roberto Saviano, 

Heroin